Carenum versicolor is a species of ground beetles in the subfamily Scaritinae. It was described by Sloane in 1897. It is found in Australia.

References

External links 
 Carenum versicolor at Atlas of Living Australia

versicolor
Beetles described in 1897
Beetles of Australia